South Korea, officially the Republic of Korea, competed at the 2016 Summer Olympics in Rio de Janeiro, Brazil, from 5 to 21 August 2016. This was the nation's seventeenth appearance at the Olympics. The Korean Olympic Committee sent the nation's smallest ever delegation to the Games in Olympic history since 1984. A total of 205 athletes, 103 men and 101 women, competed in 24 sports.

Medalists

The following South Korean competitors won medals at the Games. In the by discipline sections below, medalists' names are bolded.

|  style="text-align:left; width:78%; vertical-align:top;"|

|  style="text-align:left; width:22%; vertical-align:top;"|

Competitors
The Korean Olympic Committee (KOC) selected a team of 204 athletes, 103 men and 101 women, to compete in 22 sports; it was the nation's smallest team sent to the Olympics since 1984, just six athletes relatively short of its size. South Korea did not qualify athletes in basketball, rugby sevens, tennis, and triathlon.

| width=78% align=left valign=top |
The following is the list of number of competitors participating in the Games. Note that reserves in fencing, field hockey, football, and handball are not counted as athletes:

Archery

South Korean archers qualified each for the men's and women's events after having secured a top eight finish in their respective team recurves at the 2015 World Archery Championships in Copenhagen, Denmark.

With a top eight placement at the Worlds, the spots for the three men and three women from South Korea will be determined in two national selection meets by April 2016. The South Korean archery team, led by London 2012 Olympic champion Ki Bo-bae, was announced on April 19, 2016. On August 5, 2016, Kim Woo-jin set a world record by scoring 700 out of a possible 720 in the seeding round of the men's individual recurve.

Men

Women

Athletics

South Korean athletes have achieved qualifying standards in the following event (up to a maximum of 3 athletes in each event):

Track & road events
Men

Women

Field events

Badminton

South Korea qualified a total of fourteen badminton players for each of the following events into the Olympic tournament based on the BWF World Rankings as of 5 May 2016: two entries each in the men's and women's singles, as well as the men's, women's doubles, and one in the mixed doubles.

Men

Women

Mixed

Boxing

South Korea entered one boxer to compete in the men's bantamweight division into the Olympic competition. Ham Sang-myeong received a spare Olympic berth, as the next highest-ranked boxer, not yet qualified, in the AIBA Pro Boxing (APB) rankings, as France's top boxer Khedafi Djelkhir decided to withdraw from the Games and thereby announce his retirement from the sport.

Canoeing

Sprint
South Korea qualified a single boat in men's K-2 200 m for the Games at the 2015 Asian Canoe Sprint Championships in Palembang, Indonesia, as the quota spot had been passed to the highest finisher not yet qualified.

Qualification Legend: FA = Qualify to final (medal); FB = Qualify to final B (non-medal)

Cycling

Road
South Korean riders qualified for a maximum of three quota places in the men's Olympic road race by virtue of their top 4 national ranking in the 2015 UCI Asia Tour. One female rider was added to the South Korean squad to compete in the women's Olympic road race by finishing first at the 2016 Asian Championships.

Track
Following the completion of the 2016 UCI Track Cycling World Championships, South Korean riders have accumulated spots in the men's team sprint and men's omnium. As a result of their place in the men's team sprint, South Korea assured its right to enter two riders in both men's sprint and men's keirin. Although South Korea failed to win a quota place in the women's team sprint, they managed to claim a single place in the women's keirin, by virtue of their final individual UCI Olympic rankings in that event.

Sprint

Team sprint

Keirin

Omnium

Diving

South Korean divers qualified for the following individual and synchronized team spots at the 2016 Olympic Games through the World Championships and the FINA World Cup series.

Equestrian

South Korea entered one dressage rider into the Olympic equestrian competition by virtue of a top national finish from Asia and Oceania at the FEI qualification event in Perl, Germany.

Dressage

Fencing

South Korean fencers have qualified a full squad each in the men's and women's team épée and women's team sabre by virtue of being the highest ranking team from Asia outside the world's top four in the FIE Olympic Team Rankings.

London 2012 Olympians Gu Bon-gil, Kim Jung-hwan, and Jeon Hee-sook, along with 2008 Olympic silver medalist Nam Hyun-hee, had secured their individual spots in the men's sabre and women's foil, respectively, by finishing among the top 14 fencers in the FIE Adjusted Official Rankings. They were joined by four-time Asian men's foil champion Heo Jun as one of the two highest-ranked fencers from Asia outside the world's top eight qualified teams. Other fencers also featured London 2012 sabre champion Kim Ji-yeon and bronze medalist Jung Jin-sun in men's épée.

The fencing team was officially named to the South Korean roster for the Games on June 22, 2016.

Men

Women

Field hockey

Summary

Women's tournament

South Korea women's field hockey team qualified for the Olympics by receiving a berth and earning the gold medal from the 2014 Asian Games in Incheon.

Team roster

Group play

Football

Men's tournament

South Korea men's football team qualified for the Olympics by virtue of a top two finish at and by progressing to the gold medal match of the 2016 AFC U-23 Championship in Qatar.

Team roster

Group play

Quarterfinal

Golf 

South Korea entered six golfers (two men and four women) into the Olympic tournament. An Byeong-hun (world no. 31) and Wang Jeung-hun (world no. 76) qualified directly among the top 60 eligible players for the men's event, while top 15 seeds Park Inbee, Amy Yang, Kim Sei-young, and Chun In-gee did so for the women's based on the IGF World Rankings as of 11 July 2016.

Gymnastics

Artistic
South Korea fielded a full squad of five gymnasts in the men's artistic gymnastics events. The men's team qualified through a top eight finish at the 2015 World Artistic Gymnastics Championships in Glasgow. Meanwhile, an additional Olympic berth had been awarded to the South Korean female gymnast, who participated in the apparatus and all-around events at the Olympic Test Event in Rio de Janeiro. The men's artistic gymnastics team was named to the Olympic roster on June 22, 2016. Lee Go-im was selected to represent South Korea in the women's artistic gymnastics for the Games on June 12, 2016, with the men's squad joining her at the end of Olympic Team Trials on July 8. Before the start of the Games, Lee Go-im suffered an arm injury in training which forced her to withdraw. She was replaced by Lee Eun-ju.

Men
Team

Women

Rhythmic 
South Korea qualified one rhythmic gymnast for the individual all-around by finishing in the top 15 at the 2015 World Championships in Stuttgart, Germany.

Handball

Summary

Women's tournament

South Korea women's handball team qualified for the Olympics by winning the Asian Olympic Qualification Tournament in Nagoya, Japan.

Team roster

Group play

Judo

South Korea qualified a total of twelve judokas for each of the following weight classes at the Games. Eleven of them (seven men and four women) were ranked among the top 22 eligible judokas for men and top 14 for women in the IJF World Ranking List of May 30, 2016, while Bak Ji-yun at women's half-middleweight (63 kg) earned a continental quota spot from the Asian region as South Korea's top-ranked judoka outside of direct qualifying position.

Men

Women

Modern pentathlon

South Korea qualified a total of three modern pentathletes for the following events at the Games. Jun Woong-tae, Lee Dong-gi, and Kim Sun-woo finished among the top five in their respective events at the 2015 Asia & Oceania Championships. London 2012 Olympian Jung Jin-hwa became the third South Korean to qualify for the men's event in Rio, as a result of his world ranking as of May 31, 2016, resulting him and Jun Woong-tae (world no. 11) to be selected to the Olympic team over Lee Dong-gi, as the nation's top two modern pentathletes on the list.

Rowing

South Korea qualified one boat each in the men's and women's single sculls for the Olympics at the 2016 Asia & Oceania Continental Qualification Regatta in Chungju.

Qualification Legend: FA=Final A (medal); FB=Final B (non-medal); FC=Final C (non-medal); FD=Final D (non-medal); FE=Final E (non-medal); FF=Final F (non-medal); SA/B=Semifinals A/B; SC/D=Semifinals C/D; SE/F=Semifinals E/F; QF=Quarterfinals; R=Repechage

Sailing

South Korean sailors have qualified one boat in each of the following classes through the individual fleet World Championships and Asian qualifying regattas.

M = Medal race; EL = Eliminated – did not advance into the medal race

Shooting

South Korean shooters have achieved quota places for the following events by virtue of their best finishes at the 2014 and 2015 ISSF World Championships, the 2015 ISSF World Cup series, and Asian Championships, as long as they obtained a minimum qualifying score (MQS) by March 31, 2016. To assure their nomination to the Olympic team, shooters must compete at two separate legs of Olympic Trials: air gun (March 14 to 18) in Naju and small-bore (March 30 to April 10) in Daegu.

A total of 17 shooters (eight men and nine women) were selected to the South Korean roster, with Jin Jong-oh aiming to defend the Olympic title in the men's air pistol at his fourth straight Games. Among the shooters also featured London 2012 champion Kim Jang-mi (women's 25 m pistol) and silver medalist Kim Jong-hyun (men's 50 m rifle 3 positions).

With Jin Jong-oh securing quota places in both men's air and free pistol as a double starter, the South Korean team decided to exchange one of them with an additional spot in the women's 10 m air rifle instead based on performances throughout the qualifying period. The slot was awarded to Park Hae-mi.

Men

Women

Qualification Legend: Q = Qualify for the next round; q = Qualify for the bronze medal (shotgun)

Swimming

South Korean swimmers have so far achieved qualifying standards in the following events (up to a maximum of 2 swimmers in each event at the Olympic Qualifying Time (OQT), and potentially 1 at the Olympic Selection Time (OST)): To secure their nomination to the Olympic team, swimmers must attain a top two finish under the FINA Olympic qualifying A standard in each of the individual pool events at the Dong-A Swimming Competition (April 25 to 29) in Gwangju.

A total of eight swimmers (three men and five women) were selected to the South Korean roster for the Games at the end of the qualifying period, with Athens 2004 top eight finalist Nam Yoo-sun and four-time medalist Park Tae-hwan becoming the first to compete at their fourth Olympics. On July 8, 2016, the Korean Olympic Committee officially allowed Park to join the swimming team, following his appeal to the Court of Arbitration for Sport against a three-year suspension imposed by the committee for testing positive on banned testosterone.

Men

Women

Table tennis

South Korea fielded a team of six athletes into the table tennis competition at the Games. Jung Young-sik, Lee Sang-su, Jeon Ji-hee, and Seo Hyo-won were automatically selected among the top 22 eligible players each in their respective singles events based on the ITTF Olympic Rankings.

London 2012 silver medalist Joo Sae-hyuk and two-time Youth Olympic medalist Yang Ha-eun were each awarded the third spot to build the men's and women's teams for the Games by virtue of a top 10 national finish in the ITTF Olympic Rankings.

Men

Women

Taekwondo

South Korea entered five athletes into the taekwondo competition at the Olympics. Three men, including 2008 Olympic champion Cha Dong-min, and 2012 Olympic silver medalist Lee Dae-hoon, and two women qualified automatically for their respective weight classes by finishing in the top 6 WTF Olympic rankings.

Volleyball

Indoor

Women's tournament

South Korea women's volleyball team qualified for the Olympics by virtue of a top three national finish at the first meet of the World Olympic Qualifying Tournament in Tokyo, Japan.

Team roster

Group play

Quarterfinal

Weightlifting

South Korean weightlifters have qualified four men's and three women's quota places for the Rio Olympics based on their combined team standing by points at the 2014 and 2015 IWF World Championships. The team must allocate these places to individual athletes by June 20, 2016.

The full weightlifting team was announced on July 4, 2016, with London 2012 Olympian Won Jeong-sik and Beijing 2008 silver medalist Yoon Jin-hee leading the athletes for their second Olympic appearance.

Men

Women

Wrestling

South Korea qualified a total of five wrestlers for each of the following weight classes into the Olympic competition. One of them finished among the top six to book an Olympic spot in the men's Greco-Roman 66 kg at the 2015 World Championships, while two more Olympic places were awarded to South Korean wrestlers, who progressed to the top two finals at the 2016 Asian Qualification Tournament.

Two further wrestlers had claimed the remaining Olympic slots to round out the South Korean roster in separate Olympic Qualification Tournaments; one of them in men's Greco-Roman 59 kg at the initial meet in Ulaanbaatar and the other in men's freestyle 86 kg at the final meet in Istanbul.

Men's freestyle

Men's Greco-Roman

See also
South Korea at the 2016 Summer Paralympics

References

External links 

 
 

Olympics
Nations at the 2016 Summer Olympics
2016